Diamond Lake Township is one of twelve townships in Dickinson County, Iowa, USA.  As of the 2000 census, its population was 296.

Geography
According to the United States Census Bureau, Diamond Lake Township covers an area of 28.79 square miles (74.58 square kilometers); of this, 28.26 square miles (73.19 square kilometers, 98.14 percent) is land and 0.53 square miles (1.38 square kilometers, 1.85 percent) is water.

Unincorporated towns
 Montgomery at 
(This list is based on USGS data and may include former settlements.)

Adjacent townships
 Spirit Lake Township (east)
 Center Grove Township (southeast)
 Lakeville Township (south)
 Excelsior Township (southwest)
 Silver Lake Township (west)

Major highways
  Iowa Highway 86

Lakes
 Diamond Lake
 Welsh Lake

School districts
 Harris-Lake Park Community School District
 Spirit Lake Community School District

Political districts
 Iowa's 5th congressional district
 State House District 06
 State Senate District 03

References
 United States Census Bureau 2007 TIGER/Line Shapefiles
 United States Board on Geographic Names (GNIS)
 United States National Atlas

External links

 
US-Counties.com
City-Data.com

Townships in Dickinson County, Iowa
Townships in Iowa